The Cleveland Barons were a professional American ice hockey team in the American Hockey League. They played in Cleveland, Ohio, at Gund Arena between 2001 and 2006.

History

The team was named in honor of the popular Barons team that played in the AHL and its forerunners from 1929 to 1973 and the National Hockey League (NHL) team of the same name. The Barons name was revived in 2001 when the San Jose Sharks purchased their AHL affiliate, the Kentucky Thoroughblades, and relocated them to Cleveland, where they would play at the arena which was owned and operated by Sharks owners George and Gordon Gund.  The Gunds had also owned the NHL Barons, who played in the NHL in the late 1970s before being merged with the Minnesota North Stars in 1978.

The franchise relocated to Worcester, Massachusetts, for the 2006–07 season and became the Worcester Sharks.  Dan Gilbert, owner of the  Cleveland Cavaliers of the National Basketball Association (NBA), purchased the inactive Utah Grizzlies AHL franchise and moved it to Cleveland. Renamed the Lake Erie Monsters, the club resumed play in 2007 and then rebranded as the Cleveland Monsters in 2016.

The team logo, a shark holding a hockey stick, was originally designed as an alternate logo for the San Jose Sharks before being modified with a top hat, a monocle, and formal wear for the Barons.

This market was previously served by:
 Cleveland Indians/Falcons/Barons (1929–1973) IHL/IAHL/AHL
 Cleveland Crusaders (1972–1976) WHA
 Cleveland Barons (NHL) (1976–1978)
 Cleveland Lumberjacks (1992–2001) IHL

This market is now the home to:
 Lake Erie/Cleveland Monsters (2007–present)

Affiliates
 San Jose Sharks (2001-2006)

Season-by-season results

Regular season

Playoffs

Team records

Single Season
Goals: 35 Mike Craig (2001–02), Miroslav Zalesak (2003–04)
Assists: 48 Jeff Nelson (2002–03)
Points: 75 Miroslav Zalesak (2003–04)
Points, Defenseman: 46 Garrett Stafford (2003-04)
Penalty Minutes: 335 Matt Carkner (2001–02)
Wins: 19 Vesa Toskala (2001–02)
GAA: 2.34 Nolan Schaefer (2003–04)
SV%: .925 Seamus Kotyk (2003–04), Nolan Schaefer (2003–04)

Career
Career Goals: 84 Miroslav Zalesak
Career Assists: 117 Patrick Rissmiller
Career Points: 181 Patrick Rissmiller
Career Penalty Minutes: 948 Matt Carkner
Career Goaltending Wins: 34 Vesa Toskala
Career Shutouts: 7 Nolan Schaefer
Career Games: 315 Matt Carkner

External links
 The Internet Hockey Database - Cleveland Barons

 
San Jose Sharks minor league affiliates
Ice hockey clubs established in 2001
Ice hockey teams in Ohio
Ice hockey clubs disestablished in 2006
2001 establishments in Ohio
2006 disestablishments in Ohio